Husar or HUSAR may refer to: 

Húsar, a village at the Faroe Islands
Heavy Urban Search and Rescue, a type of response to disaster situations in a city
Husar-rover, an experimental planetary rover design, built in Hungary as part of the Hunveyor project

People with the surname
Emma Husar (born 1980), Australian politician
Lubomyr Husar (1933–2017), Ukrainian Catholic archbishop and cardinal
Martin Husár (born 1985), Slovak football player

See also
Hussar